Kirsten Verbist (born 11 March 1987 in Malle, Antwerp) is a Belgian figure skater. She is the 2006 Belgian national champion and finished second in the 2007 Belgian Figure Skating Championships.

External links
 

Belgian female single skaters
1987 births
Living people
People from Malle
Sportspeople from Antwerp Province
21st-century Belgian women